Deaf Child Worldwide is the International Development arm of the National Deaf Children's Society (NDCS).  It is the only UK-based international development agency dedicated to enabling deaf children to overcome poverty and isolation.  Deaf Child Worldwide currently supports projects in South Asia (India, Bangladesh, Nepal and Sri Lanka), East Africa (Kenya, Tanzania and Uganda), and South America (Bolivia, Colombia, Ecuador and Peru). It works alongside inclusive schools, NGO's and parents groups in the host countries to campaign for rights protection and positive change for deaf children and young people.

Deaf Child Worldwide's projects mainly focus on improving education for deaf children, improving communication within the family, providing home support, giving advice on reproductive health, encouraging community leaders and parents to advocate on behalf of deaf rights or a mixture of the above.

External links 
 Deaf Child Worldwide
 More about DCW

Deaf culture
Deafness organizations
Deafness charities